Saafan El-Sagheer (born 7 January 1968) is a retired Egyptian football goalkeeper. He was a squad member for the 1992 and 1994 African Cup of Nations.

References

1968 births
Living people
Egyptian footballers
Ismaily SC players
Egyptian Premier League players
Egypt international footballers
1992 African Cup of Nations players
1994 African Cup of Nations players
Association football goalkeepers
Ismaily SC managers